Binge eating disorder (BED) is an eating disorder characterized by frequent and recurrent binge eating episodes with associated negative psychological and social problems, but without the compensatory behaviors common to bulimia nervosa, OSFED, or the binge-purge subtype of anorexia nervosa.

BED is a recently described condition, which was required to distinguish binge eating similar to that seen in bulimia nervosa but without characteristic purging. Individuals who are diagnosed with bulimia nervosa and binge eating disorder exhibit similar patterns of compulsive overeating, neurobiological features of dysfunctional cognitive control and food addiction, and biological and environmental risk factors. Some professionals consider BED to be a milder form of bulimia with the two conditions on the same spectrum.

Binge eating is one of the most prevalent eating disorders among adults, though there tends to be less media coverage and research about the disorder in comparison to anorexia nervosa and bulimia nervosa.

Signs and symptoms

Binge eating is the core symptom of BED; however, not everyone who binge eats has BED. An individual may occasionally binge eat without experiencing many of the negative physical, psychological, or social effects of BED. This may be considered disordered eating rather than a clinical disorder. Precisely defining binge eating can be problematic, however, binge eating episodes in BED are generally described as having the following potential features:

 Eating much faster than normal, perhaps in a short space of time
 Eating until feeling uncomfortably full
 Eating a large amount when not hungry
 Subjective loss of control over how much or what is eaten
 Planning and allocating specific times for binging
 Eating alone or secretly
 Not being able to remember what was eaten after the binge
 Feelings of guilt, shame or disgust following a food binge
Body image disturbance

In contrast to bulimia nervosa, binge eating episodes are not regularly followed by activities intended to compensate for the amount of food consumed, such as self-induced vomiting, laxative or enema misuse, or strenuous exercise. BED is characterized more by overeating than dietary restriction. Those with BED often have poor body image and frequently diet, but are unsuccessful due to the severity of their binge eating.

Obesity is common in persons with BED, as is depression, low self-esteem, stress and boredom. Regarding cognitive abilities, individuals showing severe binge eating symptoms may experience small dysfunctions in executive functions. Those with BED are also at risk of Non-alcoholic fatty liver disease, menstrual irregularities such as amenorrhea, and gastrointestinal problems such as acid reflux and heartburn.

Causes 

As with other eating disorders, binge eating is an "expressive disorder"—a disorder that is an expression of deeper psychological problems. People who have binge eating disorder have been found to have higher weight bias internalization, which includes low self-esteem, unhealthy eating patterns, and general body dissatisfaction. Binge eating disorder commonly develops as a result or side effect of depression, as it is common for people to turn to comfort foods when they are feeling down.

There was resistance to give binge eating disorder the status of a fully fledged eating disorder because many perceived binge eating disorder to be caused by individual choices. Previous research has focused on the relationship between body image and eating disorders, and concludes that disordered eating might be linked to rigid dieting practices. In the majority of cases of anorexia, extreme and inflexible restriction of dietary intake leads at some point to the development of binge eating, weight regain, bulimia nervosa, or a mixed form of eating disorder not otherwise specified. When under a strict diet that mimics the effects of starvation, the body may be preparing for a new type of behavior pattern, one that consumes a large amount of food in a relatively short period of time.

Some studies show that BED aggregates in families and could be genetic. However, very few published studies around the genetics exist.

However, other research suggests that binge eating disorder can also be caused by environmental factors and the impact of traumatic events. One study showed that women with binge eating disorder experienced more adverse life events in the year prior to the onset of the development of the disorder, and that binge eating disorder was positively associated with how frequently negative events occur. Additionally, the research found that individuals who had binge eating disorder were more likely to have experienced physical abuse, perceived risk of physical abuse, stress, and body criticism. Other risk factors may include childhood obesity, critical comments about weight, low self-esteem, depression, and physical or sexual abuse in childhood. A systematic review concluded that bulimia nervosa and binge eating disorder are impacted by family separations, a loss in their lives, and negative parent-child interactions A few studies have suggested that there could be a genetic component to binge eating disorder, though other studies have shown more ambiguous results. Studies have shown that binge eating tends to run in families and a twin study by Bulik, Sullivan, and Kendler has shown a, "moderate heritability for binge eating" at 41 percent. Studies have also shown that eating disorders such as anorexia and bulimia reduce coping abilities, which makes it more likely for those suffering to turn to binge eating as a coping strategy.

"In the U.S, it is estimated that 3.5% of young women and 30% to 40% of people who seek weight loss treatments, can be clinically diagnosed with binge eating disorder."

Diagnosis

International Classification of Diseases
The 2017 update to the American version of the ICD-10 includes BED under F50.81. ICD-11 may contain a dedicated entry (6B62), defining BED as frequent, recurrent episodes of binge eating (once a week or more over a period of several months) which are not regularly followed by inappropriate compensatory behaviors aimed at preventing weight gain.

According to the World Health Organization's ICD-11 classification of BED, the severity of the disorder can be classified as mild (1-3 episodes/week), moderate (4-7 episodes/week), severe (8-13 episodes/week) and extreme (>14 episodes/week).

Diagnostic and Statistical Manual
Initially considered a topic for further research exploration, binge eating disorder was first included in the Diagnostic and Statistical Manual of Mental Disorders (DSM) in 1994 simply as a feature of eating disorder. In 2013 it gained formal recognition as a psychiatric condition in the DSM-5. Until 2013, binge eating disorder was categorized as an Eating Disorder Not Otherwise Specified, an umbrella category for eating disorders that don't fall under the categories for anorexia nervosa or bulimia nervosa.  Because it was not a recognized psychiatric disorder in the DSM until 2013, it has been difficult to obtain insurance reimbursement for treatments. The disorder now has its own category under DSM-5, which outlines the signs and symptoms that must be present to classify a person's behavior as binge eating disorder. Studies have confirmed the high predictive value of these criteria for diagnosing BED.

One study claims that the method for diagnosing BED is for a clinician to conduct a structured interview using the DSM-5 criteria or taking the Eating Disorder Examination. The Structured Clinical Interview for DSM (SCID-5) takes no more than 75 minutes to complete and has a systematic approach which follows the DSM-5 criteria. The Eating Disorder Examination is a semi-structured interview which identifies the frequency of binges and associated eating disorder features.

Treatment 
Counselling and certain medication, such as lisdexamfetamine and selective serotonin reuptake inhibitors (SSRIs), may help. Some recommend a multidisciplinary approach in the treatment of the disorder.

Counselling
Cognitive behavioral therapy (CBT) treatment has been demonstrated as a more effective form of treatment for BED than behavioral weight loss programs. 50% of BED individuals achieve complete remission from binge eating and 68-90% will reduce the amount of binge eating episodes they have. CBT has also been shown to be an effective method to address self-image issues and psychiatric comorbidities (e.g., depression) associated with the disorder. The goal of CBT is to interrupt binge-eating behaviour, learn to create a normal eating schedule, change the perception around weight and shape and develop positive attitudes about one's body. Although this treatment is successful in eliminating binge eating episodes, it does not lead to losing any weight. Recent reviews have concluded that psychological interventions such as psychotherapy and behavioral interventions are more effective than pharmacological interventions for the treatment of binge eating disorder. A meta-analysis concluded that psychotherapy based on CBT not only significantly improved binge-eating symptomatology but also reduced a client's BMI significantly at posttreatment and longer than 6 and 12 months after treatment. Behavioral weight loss treatment has been proven to be effective as a means to achieve weight loss amongst patients.

Medication
Lisdexamfetamine is a USFDA-approved drug that is used for the treatment of moderate to severe binge eating disorder in adults. As of 2021, it is the first and only medication formally approved for the treatment of BED. It is thought that lisdexamfetamine treats BED through a combination of effects on appetite and satiety, reward, and cognitive processes, including attention, impulsivity, and behavioral inhibition.

Three other classes of medications are also used in the treatment of binge eating disorder: antidepressants, anticonvulsants, and anti-obesity medications. Antidepressant medications of the selective serotonin reuptake inhibitor (SSRI) have been found to effectively reduce episodes of binge eating and reduce weight. Similarly, anticonvulsant medications such as topiramate and zonisamide may be able to effectively suppress appetite. The long-term effectiveness of medication for binge eating disorder is currently unknown. For BED patients with manic episodes, risperidone is recommended. If BED patients have bipolar depression, lamotrigine is appropriate to use.

Trials of antidepressants, anticonvulsants, and anti-obesity medications suggest that these medications are superior to placebo in reducing binge eating. Medications are not considered the treatment of choice because psychotherapeutic approaches, such as CBT, are more effective than medications for binge eating disorder. A meta-analysis concluded that using medications did not reduce binge-eating episodes and BMI posttreatment at 6–12 months. This indicates a potential possibility of relapse after withdrawal from the medications. Medications also do not increase the effectiveness of psychotherapy, though some patients may benefit from anticonvulsant and anti-obesity medications, such as phentermine/topiramate, for weight loss.

Blocking opioid receptors leads to less food intake. Additionally, bupropion and naltrexone used together may cause weight loss. Combining these alongside psychotherapies like CBT may lead to better outcomes for BED.

Surgery
Bariatric surgery has also been proposed as another approach to treat BED and a recent meta-analysis showed that approximately two-thirds of individuals who seek this type of surgery for weight loss purposes have BED. Bariatric surgery recipients who had BED prior to receiving the surgery tend to have poorer weight-loss outcomes and are more likely to continue to exhibit eating behaviors characteristic of BED.

Lifestyle Interventions 
Other treatments for BED include lifestyle interventions like weight training, peer support groups, and investigation of hormonal abnormalities.

Prognosis
Individuals with BED often have a lower overall quality of life and commonly experience social difficulties. Early behavior change is an accurate prediction of remission of symptoms later.

Individuals who have BED commonly have other comorbidities such as major depressive disorder, personality disorder, bipolar disorder, substance abuse, body dysmorphic disorder, kleptomania, irritable bowel syndrome, fibromyalgia, or an anxiety disorder. Individuals may also exhibit varying degrees of panic attacks and a history of attempted suicide.

While people of a normal weight may overeat occasionally, an ongoing habit of consuming large amounts of food in a short period of time may ultimately lead to weight gain and obesity. The main physical health consequences of this type of eating disorder are brought on by the weight gain resulting from calorie-laden bingeing episodes. Mental and emotional consequences of binge eating disorder include social weight stigma and emotional loss of control. Up to 70% of individuals with BED may also be obese, and therefore obesity-associated morbidities such as high blood pressure and coronary artery disease type 2 diabetes mellitus gastrointestinal issues (e.g., gallbladder disease), high cholesterol levels, musculoskeletal problems and obstructive sleep apnea may also be present.

Epidemiology

General 
The prevalence of BED in the general population is approximately 1-3%.

BED cases usually occur between the ages of 12.4 and 24.7, but prevalence rates increase until the age of 40.

Binge eating disorder is the most common eating disorder in adults.

The limited amount of research that has been done on BED shows that rates of binge eating disorder are fairly comparable among men and women. The lifetime prevalence of binge eating disorder has been observed in studies to be 2.0 percent for men and 3.5 percent for women, higher than that of the commonly recognized eating disorders anorexia nervosa and bulimia nervosa. However another systematic literature review found the prevalence average to be about 2.3% in women and about 0.3% in men. Lifetime prevalence rates for BED in women can range anywhere from 1.5 to 6 times higher than in men. One literature review found that point prevalence rates for BED vary from 0.1 percent to 24.1 percent depending on the sample. This same review also found that the 12-month prevalence rates vary between 0.1 percent to 8.8 percent.

Recent studies found that eating disorders which included anorexia nervosa, bulimia nervosa and binge-eating disorder are common among sexual and gender minority populations, including gay, lesbian, bisexual and transgender people. This could be due to the minority stress and discrimination this population experiences.

Due to limited and inconsistent information and research on ethnic and racial differences, prevalence rates are hard to determine for BED. Rates of binge eating disorder have been found to be similar among black women, white women, and white men, while some studies have shown that binge eating disorder is more common among black women than among white women. However, majority of the research done around BED is focused on White women. One literature review found information citing no difference between BED prevalence among Hispanic, African American, and White women while other information found that BED prevalence was highest among Hispanics followed by Black individuals and finally White people.

Worldwide Prevalences 
Eating disorders have usually been considered something that was specific to Western countries. However, the prevalence of eating disorders is increasing in other non-Western countries. Though the research on binge eating disorders tends to be concentrated in North America, the disorder occurs across cultures. In the US, BED is present in 0.8% of male adults and 1.6% of female adults in a given year.

The prevalence of BED is lower in Nordic countries compared to Europe in a study that included Finland, Sweden, Norway, and Iceland. The point prevalence ranged from 0.4 to 1.5 percent and the lifetime prevalence ranged from 0.7 to 5.8 percent for BED in women.

In a study that included Argentina, Brazil, Chile, Colombia, Mexico, and Venezuela, the point prevalence for BED was 3.53 percent. Therefore, this particular study found that the prevalence for BED is higher in these Latin American countries compared to Western countries.

The prevalence of BED in Europe ranges from <1 to 4 percent.

Co-morbidities 
BED is co-morbid with diabetes, hypertension, previous stroke, and heart disease in some individuals.

In people who have obsessive-compulsive disorder or bipolar I or II disorders, BED lifetime prevalence was found to be higher.

Additionally, 30 to 40 percent of individuals seeking treatment for weight-loss can be diagnosed with binge eating disorder.

Underreporting in men 
Eating disorders are oftentimes underreported in men. Underreporting could be a result of measurement bias due to how eating disorders are defined. The current definition for eating disorders focuses on thinness. However, eating disorders in men tend to center on muscularity and would therefore warrant a need for a different measurement definition. Further research should focus on including more men in samples since previous research has focused primarily on women.

Frequency 
BED is the most common eating disorder, with 47% of people with eating disorders have BED, 3% of them have anorexia nervosa and 12% of them have bulimia nervosa . In the United States, it has been estimated that 2.8 million people are affected by BED. Over 57% of people with BED are female and it often begins in the late teens or early 20s.

History
The disorder was first described in 1959 by psychiatrist and researcher Albert Stunkard as "night eating syndrome" (NES). The term "binge eating" was coined to describe the same bingeing-type eating behavior but without the exclusive nocturnal component.

There is generally less research on binge eating disorder in comparison to anorexia nervosa and bulimia nervosa.

See also 
Prader–Willi syndrome

References

Bibliography

External links 

 Binge Eating Disorder on Medscape
 Binge Eating Disorder on National Institute of Diabetes and Digestive and Kidney Diseases (NIDDK)

Eating disorders
Medical conditions related to obesity
Hyperalimentation